Maurus Gervase Komba (1923−23 February 1996) was a Tanzanian Roman Catholic bishop.

Ordained to the priesthood in 1954, Komba was named bishop of Roman Catholic Diocese of Tanga, Tanzania in 1970 and resigned in 1988.

References 

1930 births
1996 deaths
People from Ruvuma Region
20th-century Roman Catholic bishops in Tanzania
Roman Catholic bishops of Tanga